Tatjana Ječmenica-Jevtić (born July 4, 1978) is a Serbian former professional tennis player. Since 2014, she has been captain of Serbia Fed Cup team. This is her second stint at the helm,; she previously led the team between 2005 and 2007.

Ječmenica won six singles and three doubles titles on the ITF Circuit in her career. On 24 June 1996, she reached her best singles ranking at world No. 72. On 29 July 1996, she peaked at No. 88 in doubles rankings.

In Grand Slams her best result was reaching the second round at the US Open in 1995 and at the French Open in 1996.

Career
Ječmenica started playing tennis in her hometown of Novi Sad at the age of seven and attended the same school and played in the same tennis club as Monica Seles.

Juniors
In 1993, as a second seed Ječmenica reached the final of Orange Bowl 16s, where she was defeated by fifth seed Stephanie Halsell, who avenged previous years loss to Ječmenica in the quarterfinals of Junior Orange Bowl 14s (Ječmenica was eventually stopped in the semifinals of that tournament). She won Port Washington 14s. In 1994, she lost in the first round of Junior French Open, but won German Junior Open, a Grade 1 event, without losing a set in the tournament.

Junior Grand Slam results - Singles:

Australian Open: –
French Open: 1R (1994)
Wimbledon: –
US Open: –

Junior Grand Slam results - Doubles:

Australian Open: –
French Open: 2R (1994)
Wimbledon: –
US Open: –

Professional
As a very perspective youth she enrolled at the Nick Bollettieri Tennis Academy.

After her longtime coach, Dragan Ćirić Šeki, who coached her since she was nine, died in a car accident on 10 October 1997, Ječmenica didn't play for five months after being unable to find a new coach. She also briefly trained at the Nikola Pilić Tennis Academy before retiring in 1998 at the age of 20.

In 2001, she played her first doubles tournament in over three years and over the next several years would play two more doubles tournaments, reaching one final in 2004, before retiring for good in 2005.

Coaching
Following her playing career, Ječmenica became a tennis coach and in 2004 founded tennis school "Ječmenica" in her hometown of Novi Sad for children aged 5 to 20, with some being ranked in the top 10 in the country.

She served as the captain of Serbia Fed Cup team from 2005 until her resignation on 20 February 2007.

On 5 November 2014, Ječmenica was named the captain of Serbia's Fed Cup team for the second time.

ITF Circuit finals

Singles: 9 (6 titles, 3 runner-ups)

Doubles: 7 (3 titles, 4 runner-ups)

References

External links
 
 
 
 Interview for local newspaper Dnevnik (01–29–2005) 
 Interview for Ilustrovana politika (2007) 

1978 births
Living people
Sportspeople from Novi Sad
Serbian female tennis players
Serbian tennis coaches
Serbia and Montenegro female tennis players
Yugoslav female tennis players